Jet is a given name which may be either masculine or feminine. It is relatively common in Dutch-speaking countries, as a nickname for certain feminine given names (for example, Henriette or Mariëtte), and is pronounced  in that context. It is rarer in English-speaking countries, where it is generally a masculine nickname or adopted name, pronounced .

 Jet Black (born 1938), English drummer, member of The Stranglers
 Jet Bussemaker (Mariëtte, born 1961), Dutch politician
 Jet Harris (1939–2011), English bass guitarist, member of The Shadows
 Jet Jongeling (born 1977), Dutch cyclist
 Jet Li (born 1963), Chinese martial artist and actor
 Jet Lowe, American photographer
 Jet O'Rourke, Australian musician
 Jet Rowland (2002–2004), Australian road accident victim
 Jet Tila (born 1975), American celebrity chef and restauranteur
 Jet Travolta (1992-2009), Hollywood actor, John Travolta's son

 Jet van Noortwijk (Ariette, born 1968), Dutch cricketer
 Jet Zoon (born 1988), Dutch musician and composer
 Tateo Ozaki (born 1954), Japanese golfer, nicknamed "Jet"

Dutch feminine given names
English masculine given names
English-language masculine given names